Sharada is a Unicode block containing historic characters for writing Kashmiri, Sanskrit, and other languages of the northern Indian subcontinent in the 8th to 20th centuries.

History
The following Unicode-related documents record the purpose and process of defining specific characters in the Sharada block:

References 

Unicode blocks